is a Japanese football player. He plays for Blaublitz Akita.

Career
Koki Shimosaka joined J1 League club Avispa Fukuoka in 2016. On, he debuted in J.League Cup (v Kawasaki Frontale).

Club statistics
Updated to 25 December 2021.

References

External links
Profile at Machida Zelvia
Profile at Avispa Fukuoka

1993 births
Living people
National Institute of Fitness and Sports in Kanoya alumni
Association football people from Fukuoka Prefecture
Japanese footballers
J1 League players
J2 League players
Avispa Fukuoka players
FC Machida Zelvia players
Blaublitz Akita players
Association football defenders